Lusevera is a comune (municipality) in the Province of Udine in the Italian region Friuli-Venezia Giulia, located about  northwest of Trieste and about  north of Udine, on the border with Slovenia, and borders the following municipalities: Gemona del Friuli, Kobarid (Slovenia), Montenars, Nimis, Resia, Taipana, Tarcento, and Venzone.

Ethnic composition 

86,4% of the population were Slovenes according to the 1971 census.

See also 
Venetian Slovenia
Slovene Lands

References

Cities and towns in Friuli-Venezia Giulia